This is a list of post-nominal letters given in Ireland. Most are used by custom rather than arising from any legislation.

List

References

Ireland-related lists
Orders, decorations, and medals of Ireland
Ireland